António Vilar (October 31, 1912 – August 16, 1995) was a Portuguese actor who worked in Spanish cinema as well as appearing in at least one French film and in one Italian film. He also acted in Portuguese cinema

Selected filmography
O pátio das cantigas (1942)
Camões (1946)
 The Holy Queen (1947)
 Mare Nostrum (1948)
 Guarany (1948)
 The Sunless Street (1948)
 Just Any Woman (1949)
 Wings of Youth (1949)
Don Juan (1950)
 Dawn of America (1951)
 Beautiful Love (1951)
 Love and Desire (1951)
Maleficio (1953)
El festín de Satanás (1955)
 La Quintrala (1955) 
Los hermanos corsos (1955)
 Night and Dawn (1958)
Il padrone delle ferriere (1959)
The Woman and the Puppet (1959)
Shéhérazade (1963)
Proceso a la Ley (1964)
High Season for Spies (1966)

External links

People from Lisbon
Portuguese male film actors
Portuguese emigrants to Spain
Spanish male film actors
1912 births
1995 deaths
20th-century Portuguese male actors